Esperanza is the Spanish word for hope, and may refer to:

Places

Philippines
 Esperanza, Agusan del Sur, a municipality
 Esperanza, Masbate, a municipality
 Esperanza, Sultan Kudarat, a municipality

United States
 Esperanza, Mississippi, an unincorporated community
 Esperanza, New York, historic name of the village of Athens
 Esperanza, Hudspeth County, Texas, an unincorporated community
 Esperanza, Montgomery County, Texas, a ghost town
 Esperanza, Puerto Rico, a town in Vieques
 Esperanza (Jerusalem, New York), an historic home in Jerusalem, New York

Other
 Esperanza Base, a settlement in Antarctica
 Esperanza, Santa Fe, a city in Argentina
 Esperanza, Belize, a village in Cayo District, Belize
 La Esperanza, Norte de Santander, Colombia, a municipality and town
 Esperanza (Ranchuelo), a village in Cuba
 Esperanza, Dominican Republic, a municipality in Valverde province
 La Esperanza, Ecuador, a town and parish
 La Esperanza, Quetzaltenango, Guatemala, a municipality
 La Esperanza, Honduras, a city and municipality in Intibucá Department
 Esperanza (municipality), a town and municipality in Puebla, Mexico
 Esperanza, Ucayali, a city in Peru
 La Esperanza, the seat of the municipality of El Rosario, Tenerife, in the Canary Islands of Spain

People
 Esperanza (given name), a Spanish feminine given name
 Gabriel Esperanza, 17th-century rabbi

Film and TV
 Esperanza (film), a 1946 Mexican film
 Esperanza (Philippine TV series)
 Esperanza (Chilean TV series), a 2011 telenovela

Music
 Esperanza, a flamenco project by Carlos Villalobos

Albums
 Esperanza (Michael Rother album), 1996
 Esperanza (Esperanza Spalding album), 2008
 Próxima Estación: Esperanza, a 2001 album by Manu Chao

Songs
 "Esperanza" (Charles Aznavour song), 1961
 "Esperanza" (Enrique Iglesias song), 1998

Organizations
 Esperanza Unida, Inc., a non-profit organization that provides job training and placement to unemployed minority workers in Milwaukee, Wisconsin, United States
 Esperanza International, a non-profit organization that develops Dominican Republican communities through microfinancing

Other uses
 MV Esperanza, a 1984 Greenpeace ship
 Esperanza (Madrid Metro), a station of the Madrid Metro
 Esperanza (bug), a genus of bugs
 Tecoma stans, a yellow flower sometimes called esperanza
 Esperanza High School, Anaheim, California, United States
 Esperanza Drum and Bugle Corps, a modern drum corps from San Diego, California, United States
 Esperanza Ortega, the title character of Esperanza Rising, a 2000 novel
 La Esperanza Airport, Nicaragua
 Esperanza Diamond, found in Crater of Diamonds State Park

See also
 Esperanza Fire, a wind-driven arson fire that started in a river wash near Cabazon, California
 Esperança (disambiguation)
 Esperanto, the most widely spoken constructed international auxiliary language
 Teatro de la Ciudad, Mexico City, formerly Teatro Esperanza Iris